The world's busiest city airport systems by passenger traffic are measured by total number of passengers from all airports within a city or metropolitan area combined. London, with six commercial airports serving its metropolitan area, is the busiest city airport system in the world, although Hartsfield–Jackson Atlanta International Airport is the world's busiest individual airport.

2019 statistics

2018 statistics

2017 statistics

2016 statistics

2015 statistics

2014 statistics

2012 statistics
The following list is based on information provided by the Airports Council International's preliminary full-year figures for the Top 30 airports in the world, and the Top 50 airports in the US

2010 statistics
The following list is based on two lists compiled by CAPA Centre for Aviation based on data from Airports Council International, one ranking cities with multiple airports and the other ranking individual airports.

References

 City